G.A.R. Memorial Junior/Senior High School (commonly known throughout the area simply as 'G.A.R.') was a high school located on 250 South Grant Street, in Wilkes-Barre, located in Luzerne County, Pennsylvania, United States.

G.A.R. was both a junior and senior public high school, offering education to students in grades 7–12. It was named for the Grand Army of the Republic. In 2021, it was consolidated with other high schools in the area to form Wilkes-Barre Area High School.

History 
The school was built in 1925 after construction started in 1921, four years earlier. In 1978, the school district decided to make extensions to the school; this construction was completed in October 1979. The extension included a new cafeteria, gym, chorus room, and band room. The original cafeteria was demolished and turned into the faculty parking, the Girls Gym was changed into the Library and Girls Gym changing room was remodeled into the Home Ec rooms, the Boys Gym was remodeled into the Tech Ed room, the Boys Gym changing room was changed into the Woodshop room, and the chorus and band rooms were bricked off.

In 2005, a weight room was added, where all students and faculty are allowed to work out from 7:30 am to 4:00 pm, Monday to Friday. In 2013, the school installed a new turf field in front of the building, replacing the old turf which was worn and damaged after years of use.

The school was consolidated into Wilkes-Barre Area High School prior to the 2021–2022 school year. It is being renovated to be used as a middle school.

Notable alumni 
 David Bohm - Quantum physicist who was involved in the Manhattan Project.
 Mark James Klepaski- Bass player for the rock band Breaking Benjamin.
 Greg Skrepenak- Former NFL player and former Luzerne County Commissioner.
 Sam Savitt - Author and illustrator, official artist of the U.S. Equestrian Team.
 Bob Sura- NBA player who last played for the Houston Rockets
 Robert Williams - Quarterback for Notre Dame, 1956–1958
 Maurice Peoples - Olympic sprinter, 1972
 Mark Glowinski - NFL player for the New York Giants.

References 

1925 establishments in Pennsylvania
2021 disestablishments in Pennsylvania
Educational institutions established in 1925
Educational institutions disestablished in 2021
Public middle schools in Pennsylvania
Public high schools in Pennsylvania
Grand Army of the Republic
Schools in Luzerne County, Pennsylvania